Korolyov, also transliterated as Korolev or Korolov, or its feminine variant Korolyova, Koroleva, Korolova, is a common Russian surname, and the name of multiple places in Russia. It is derived from the word korol, meaning "king". 

Korolyov may refer to:

People
Aleksandr Korolyov (disambiguation), several people
Alexey Korolev (born 1987), Kazakhstani ski jumper
Andrey Korolev (1944–1999), Russian linguist
Anton Korolev, Russian ice hockey player
Boris Korolev, Soviet sculptor
Denis Borisovich Korolyov (born 1987), Russian footballer
Dmitry Korolyov (born 1988), Russian footballer
Evgeny Korolev (born 1988), Kazakhstani tennis player
Igor Korolev (1970–2011), Russian hockey player
Lev Korolyov (disambiguation), multiple people
Natasha Korolyova (born 1973), Russian singer of popular music
Nikolay Korolyov (sergeant) (1921–1943), Hero of the Soviet Union
Nikolay Korolyov (boxer) (1917–1974), Soviet boxer
Oleg Korolyov (born 1952), Governor of Lipetsk Oblast, Russia
Oleg A. Korolev (born 1968), Russian artist
Sergei Borisovich Korolyov, Russian official
Sergei Korolev (disambiguation), multiple people
Sergei Alexandrovich Korolev (1874–1932), industrial microbiology creator
Sergei Borisovich Korolev (1962–), Russian intelligence officer and deputy director of the FSB
Sergei Pavlovich Korolev (1907–1966), leading rocket engineer and designer of the Soviet Union
Yaroslav Korolev (born 1987), Russian basketball player
Yevgeni Korolyov (disambiguation), several people with this name
Yuri Korolev (born 1962), gymnast
Yuri Korolev (ice hockey) (born 1934), ice hockey administrator

Places
Korolyov Urban Okrug, a municipal formation which Korolyov City Under Oblast Jurisdiction in Moscow Oblast, Russia is incorporated as
Korolyov (inhabited locality), several inhabited localities in Russia
Korolev (lunar crater), a Lunar crater named after Sergey Korolyov
Korolev (Martian crater), a crater on Mars named after Sergey Korolyov
1855 Korolyov, an asteroid named in honour of Sergey Pavlovich Korolyov

Other
S.P. Korolev Rocket and Space Corporation Energia, an aerospace corporation named after Sergey Korolyov
Korolyov RP-318, Russia's first rocket-powered aircraft, built by Sergey Korolyov (Sergey Pavlovich Korolyov)
 "Korolev", a 2015 tune by Public Service Broadcasting
 RFS Korolev, a Ropucha-class landing ship in the Russian Navy

Russian-language surnames